J. Eugene Goddard (April 28, 1901 – December 18, 1979) was an American politician who served in the New York State Assembly from Monroe's 1st district from 1949 to 1964.

He died of a heart attack on December 18, 1979, in Rochester, New York at age 78.

References

1901 births
1979 deaths
Republican Party members of the New York State Assembly
20th-century American politicians